Gerry Svensson (29 June 1958 – 21 March 2005) was a Swedish wrestler. He competed in the men's Greco-Roman 68 kg at the 1984 Summer Olympics.

References

External links
 

1958 births
2005 deaths
Swedish male sport wrestlers
Olympic wrestlers of Sweden
Wrestlers at the 1984 Summer Olympics
Sportspeople from Skåne County